Enixotrophon procerus is a species of sea snail, a marine gastropod mollusk in the family Muricidae, the murex snails or rock snails.

Description

Distribution
This marine species occurs off New Caledonia..

References

  Houart, R. (2001). Ingensia gen. nov. and eleven new species of Muricidae (Gastropoda) from New Caledonia, Vanuatu, and Wallis and Futuna Islands. in: P. Bouchet & B.A. Marshall (eds) Tropical Deep-Sea Benthos, volume 22. Mémoires du Muséum National d'Histoire Naturelle, ser. A, Zoologie. 185: 243–269.
 Marshall B.A. & Houart R. (2011) The genus Pagodula (Mollusca: Gastropoda: Muricidae) in Australia, the New Zealand region and the Tasman Sea. New Zealand Journal of Geology and Geophysics 54(1): 89–114.
 Houart, R. & Héros, V. (2016). New species and records of deep water muricids (Gastropoda: Muricidae) from Papua New Guinea. Vita Malacologica. 15: 7-34.

External links
 Barco, A.; Marshall, B.; A. Houart, R.; Oliverio, M. (2015). Molecular phylogenetics of Haustrinae and Pagodulinae (Neogastropoda: Muricidae) with a focus on New Zealand species. Journal of Molluscan Studies. 81(4): 476-488

Gastropods described in 2001
Enixotrophon